Spryginia is a genus of flowering plants belonging to the family Brassicaceae.

Its native range is Iran to Central Asia to Afghanistan.

Species:

Spryginia afghanica 
Spryginia crassifolia 
Spryginia falcata 
Spryginia gracilis 
Spryginia pilosa 
Spryginia undulata 
Spryginia winkleri

References

Brassicaceae
Brassicaceae genera